Trần Văn Bảy was a Private First Class of the Army of the Republic of Vietnam who was awarded the Navy Cross for actions on February 19, 1967, during the Vietnam War. Bảy was one of only two South Vietnamese, and the only South Vietnamese soldier, to receive the Navy Cross during the Vietnam War (the other being Nguyễn Văn Kiệt).

Navy Cross citation
The President of the United States takes pride in presenting the Navy Cross posthumously to              

Citation:

See also 
 Nguyễn Văn Kiệt – Petty Officer Third Class, Republic of Vietnam Navy; also awarded the Navy Cross
 Nguyễn Qúy An – Major, Vietnam Air Force; awarded United States Distinguished Flying Cross

References

Year of birth missing
1967 deaths
Recipients of the Navy Cross (United States)
Vietnam War casualties
South Vietnamese military personnel killed in action
South Vietnamese military personnel of the Vietnam War
Place of birth missing